You Took My Love  is a house track released by FSOL under the alias Candese in 1991, it features a female vocalist singing very spiritedly over a funky acid house beat.

Track listing
 You Took My Love (Earth Mix) (4:17)
 You Took My Love (New Yorker Mix) (5:00)
 You Took My Love (Instrumental) (4:31)
 It's Takin' Me Over (2:31)
 I Need Somebody (3:48)

Crew
Composed By - Brian Dougans, Garry Cobain
Producer, Mixed By - The Future Sound Of London

References

External links
 

1991 songs
The Future Sound of London songs